Agios Tychonas is a town in the Limassol District of Cyprus, located east of Limassol. The ancient ruins of Amathus are located near the town.

Gallery

References

External links

Communities in Limassol District